Emerson is an English given name, a transferred use of an English surname coming either from Anglo-Saxon Emars sunu, "son of Emar," or from "son of Emery." (See also Emerson (surname).) It is in use for both boys and girls. Spelling variants such as Emersyn are also in regular use.

Usage
It has ranked among the top one thousand names for newborn boys in the United States at different times since 1880 and has been among the top three hundred names for American boys since 2013. It has been among the one thousand most used names for girls in the United States since 2002 and among the top two hundred names for girls there since 2014.

It may refer to:
   
 Emerson (footballer, born 1972) (Emerson Moisés Costa), Brazilian footballer
 Emerson (footballer, born March 1973) (Emerson Orlando de Melo), Brazilian footballer
 Émerson (footballer, born July 1973) (Émerson Luiz Firmino), Brazilian footballer
 Emerson (footballer, born August 1973) (Emerson Palmieri dos Santos), Brazilian footballer
 Emerson (footballer, born 1976) (Émerson Ferreira da Rosa), aka The Puma, Brazil international footballer
 Emerson (footballer, born July 1980) (Emerson da Silva Leal), Brazilian footballer
 Emerson (footballer, born August 1980) (Emerson Ramos Borges), Brazilian footballer
 Emerson (footballer, born May 1982) (Emerson Aparecido Vivas Vergílio), Brazilian footballer
 Emerson (footballer, born August 1982) (Emerson José da Conceição), Brazilian footballer
 Emerson (footballer, born May 1983) (Emerson dos Santos da Silva), Brazilian footballer
 Emerson (footballer, born July 1983) (Emerson Feliciano De Barros Freitas Carvalho), Brazilian footballer
 Emerson (footballer, born January 1986) (Emerson Reis Luiz), Brazilian footballer
 Emerson (footballer, born February 1986) (Emerson da Conceição), Brazilian footballer
 Emerson (footballer, born 1988) (Emerson Barbosa Rodrigues dos Santos), Brazilian footballer
 Emerson (footballer, born 2002) (Emerson Rodrigues Brito), Brazilian footballer
 Emerson Acuña (born 1979), Colombian footballer
 Emerson Alcântara (born 1970), Brazilian football manager and former player
 Emerson Boozer (born 1943), American football running back
 Emerson Carey (1906–1983), American football guard
 Emerson Carvalho (born 1993), Brazilian footballer
 Emerson Cesario (born 1990), Brazilian-born Timor-Leste international footballer
 Emerson Cris (born 1978), Brazilian football manager and former player
 Emerson Correa (born 1994), Argentine footballer
 Emerson da Luz (born 1982), Cape Verdean footballer
 Emerson Deocleciano (Emerson Santana Deocleciano; born 1999), Brazilian footballer
 Emerson Fittipaldi (born 1946), Brazilian Formula One race car driver
 Emerson Hart (born 1969), American musician
 Emerson Hyndman (born 1996), American soccer player
 Emerson Jeka (born 2001), Australian rules footballer
 Emerson Martin (born 1970), American football guard
 Emerson Nieto (born 2001), American soccer player
 Emerson Nunes (born 1981), Brazilian footballer
 Emerson Palmieri (born 1994), Brazilian-born Italy international footballer
 Emerson Panigutti (born 1976), Argentine footballer
 Emerson Paulista (Emerson de Andrade Santos; born 1980), Brazilian footballer
 Emerson Reba (born 1981), Brazilian footballer
 Emerson Rodríguez (footballer) (born 2000), Colombian footballer
 Emerson Rodríguez (volleyball) (born 1993), Venezuelan volleyball player
 Emerson Royal (Emerson Aparecido Leite de Souza Junior; born 1999), Brazilian footballer
 Emerson Santos (footballer, born 1992) (Emerson Gustavo Pinto dos Santos), Brazilian footballer
 Emerson Santos (footballer, born 1995) (Emerson Raymundo Santos), Brazilian footballer
 Emerson Sheik (Márcio Passos de Albuquerque; born 1978), Brazilian-born Qatar international footballer
 Emerson Spartz (born 1987), American webmaster for the Harry Potter fansite MuggleNet
 Emerson Thome (Emerson Augusto Thome; born 1972), retired Brazilian footballer, also known as "Paredão"
 Emerson Umaña (born 1981), Salvadoran footballer
 Emerson Windy, American hip-hop artist
 Emerson Woods (born 2000), women's Australian rules footballer
 Emersonn (born 2004), Brazilian footballer
 Nhanhá (Emerson César dos Santos; born 1980), Brazilian footballer

See also
 Emerson (surname)
 Emerson (disambiguation) for other uses

Notes

English-language unisex given names